Sports Stadium is a multi purpose stadium in Berhampur, Odisha. The ground is mainly used for organizing matches of football, cricket and other sports. The stadium has hosted three Ranji Trophy matches  from 1993 when Odisha cricket team played against Tripura cricket team.

The stadium has hosted two List A matches  in 1993 when Odisha cricket team played against Tripura cricket team and then Odisha cricket team played against Assam cricket team  until 1998 but since then the stadium has hosted non-first-class matches.

References

External links 
 Cricketarchive
 Cricinfo

Sports venues in Odisha
Cricket grounds in Odisha
Berhampur
Defunct cricket grounds in India
Sports venues completed in 1991
1991 establishments in Orissa
20th-century architecture in India